Saint Mary Cemetery (often called Saint Mary's Cemetery) is a Catholic cemetery in Oakland, Alameda County, California, adjacent to Mountain View Cemetery.

Notable burials
 Juan Bautista Alvarado (1809–1882), Mexican governor of California
 John A. Benson (1846–1910), figure in the General Land Office scandals 1890–1910.
 Delilah L. Beasley (1871–1934), historian and Oakland Tribune columnist
 John Walter Ehle (1873–1927), Spanish–American War veteran, Medal of Honor recipient
 George Hyde (1819–1890), Mayor (Alcalde) of San Francisco (as a U.S. city) prior to California statehood
 Slip Madigan (1896–1966), football coach
 Joseph A. Sheridan (1909–1962), putative inventor of Irish Coffee

Other noteworthy burials
 There is one British Commonwealth war grave, of Leading Aircraftsman James Leslie Kane, Royal Canadian Air Force (died 1941 aged 30).

References

External links
 Saint Mary Cemetery website
 
 

Cemeteries in Alameda County, California
Roman Catholic cemeteries in California
Geography of Oakland, California